The 2022 FIL European Luge Championships were held from 22 to 23 January 2022 in St. Moritz, Switzerland.

Schedule
Four events were held.

All times are local (UTC+1).

Medal summary

Medal table

Medalists

References

FIL European Luge Championships
 
European Championships
Luge
International sports competitions hosted by Switzerland
Sport in St. Moritz
Luge in Switzerland
FIL